Hohnstein is a town located in the Sächsische Schweiz-Osterzgebirge district of Saxony, Germany. As of 2020, its population numbered a total of 3,262.

Geography
It is situated in Saxon Switzerland, 12 km east of Pirna, and 28 km southeast of Dresden (centre). It is dominated by its castle, standing on a sandstone rock.

The municipal territory includes the villages (Ortsteile) of Cunnersdorf, Ehrenberg, Goßdorf, Lohsdorf, Rathewalde, Ulbersdorf and Waitzdorf.

Gallery

See also
Hohnstein Castle (Saxon Switzerland)
Schwarzbach Railway
Goßdorf-Kohlmühle railway station
Ulbersdorf railway station

References

External links

Newsreel WK2 from a private archive: http://www.archiv-akh.de/filme#1549 (Material Nr 1966, Time 10:17:28)

 
Populated places in Saxon Switzerland